On 7 June 2013, a mass murder-suicide attack occurred on a bus in Xiamen, Fujian province, China. A bus operating for the Xiamen BRT caught fire and exploded on an elevated lane near the Jinshan stop; 47 people died and 34 were injured.

Fire
Preliminary investigations conducted by the traffic police indicate that at around 6:22 p.m. CST, a Xiamen BRT bus, license plate , carrying 90 passengers, caught fire on an elevated roadway between the Caitang and Jinshan bus stops. The fire broke out in the rear end of the bus and once it had spread to the fuel tank, the bus exploded.  The fire was extinguished at around 6:50 pm CST (10:50 UTC), twenty minutes after the bus caught fire during the evening rush hour. Following the fire, the entire BRT system was temporarily shut down, reopening the following day.

Despite the bus running on diesel, investigators found traces of gasoline in the fire. This, and the fact that the oil tank and tires were intact in the wreckage, led investigators to believe the fire may have been deliberately lit. The Ministry of Public Security stated that the fire is being treated as "a serious criminal case".

Suspect
On 8 June, police identified the suspect as a man named Chen Shuizong, a local resident born on 1 March 1954. According to a suicide note found in his home, Chen was unhappy with his life and had decided to light the fire to vent his anger. Family members, speaking to reporters and posting in social media, indicated that Chen was quite angry with police officials who refused to correct an error in his identity documents regarding his age and was thus denied social security benefits.

See also
Chengdu bus fire
Daegu subway fire
Xinyang bus fire
List of transportation fires

References

2013 fires in Asia
2013 disasters in China
Arson attacks on vehicles
Arson in China
Fires in China
Mass murder in 2013
Murder–suicides in China
Suicides in the People's Republic of China
Xiamen
June 2013 events in China
2013 murders in China
21st-century mass murder in China
Suicides in China